Sergei Vladimirovich Zheleznyak (born 1970) is a Russian politician. In 2007 he was elected as a member of State Duma and became its Deputy Chairman in June 2012. He was a member of the State Duma's Committee on International Affairs. Prior to his political career he was an advertising, media, and public relations executive. 

Following his nomination Zheleznyak co-authored a law which allowed the government to block websites that it sees harmful for children. He also co-authored a law which would force internationally funded non-profit organizations to register as "foreign agents". In 2013 he spoke to RIA Novosti about prohibition of pedophilia in theatres after seeing a Golden Mask winner play called A Midsummer Night's Dream. In May of the same year Zheleznyak suggest the Duma to pass a bill that would make criticism of the World War II coalition member states' illegal and will be punished by imprisonment for up to 3 years. In June 2013 he told Economics and Life online journal that
"The US, which presents itself as a bastion of democracy, has in fact been carrying out minute-by-minute surveillance of tens of millions of citizens of Russia and other countries"
Following this remark which was in reference to Edward Snowden's leak, he referred to anti-gay law in Russia that it is an American reproach of sticking their noses into the personal correspondence of tens of millions of Russian citizens.

Sanctions
As a result of the 2014 Crimean crisis, the federal government of the United States under Barack Obama blacklisted Sergei Zheleznyak.

Personal life
Zheleznyak's daughter, Anastasia Zheleznyak, lives in London. Two of his children were educated in the UK.

References

1970 births
Living people
Communist Party of the Soviet Union members
United Russia politicians
Kiev Naval Political College alumni
Russian individuals subject to the U.S. Department of the Treasury sanctions
Fifth convocation members of the State Duma (Russian Federation)
Sixth convocation members of the State Duma (Russian Federation)
Seventh convocation members of the State Duma (Russian Federation)